Kerema Airport is an airport in Kerema, Papua New Guinea .

Airlines and destinations

Airports in Papua New Guinea
Gulf Province